Capernwray Dive Centre is a large flooded former quarry, presently operated as an inland scuba diving site and training centre, near the village of Over Kellet, Lancashire, England.

History
Formerly a 22-acre limestone quarry, after the end of its commercial use it flooded and was later converted into a dive centre.

Diving centre

There is a small dive shop, with a filling station providing air and nitrox as well as a licensed restaurant. As of 2010, the centre received around 30,000 visitors per year.

As well as being stocked with fish including trout, perch and at least two sturgeon, the underwater attractions include:
Numerous boats, including the former minesweeper HMS Podsnap
A medium range, twin turboprop airliner (a Hawker Siddeley HS 748), a Cessna 150 light aeroplane and two helicopters
A vidor diving bell
ISO shipping container
Two plastic horses
A small yellow submarine in the style of Thunderbird 4
A devil statue
Two plastic pigs
Various garden gnomes

References

Diving quarries in the United Kingdom
Lakes of Lancashire
Tourist attractions in Lancashire
Underwater diving training organizations